Love and Magnets is a Canadian romantic comedy film, directed by Yves P. Pelletier and released in 2004. The film's original French title is a pun on its themes, as the word "aimant" means magnet when used as a noun, but "loving" or "affectionate" when used as an adjective.

The film stars Isabelle Blais as Julie, a woman returning to Montreal after five years living in Guatemala with her now ex-boyfriend. She moves in with her sister and brother-in-law, Jeanne (Sylvie Moreau) and Noël (David Savard), an unhappily married couple who rarely actually see each other, communicating almost entirely through notes under fridge magnets; Jeanne is, in fact, having an extramarital affair with musician Manu (Emmanuel Bilodeau). When Jeanne decides to leave for a romantic weekend with Manu, she enlists Julie to keep leaving notes for Noël so he won't notice that she's gone — but Julie, hoping to help rekindle Jeanne and Noël's relationship, takes the opportunity to write the fake notes more romantically.

The film's music was composed by Carl Bastien and Dumas, although Blais, also a singer with the band Caïman Fu, performed the vocals on three songs.

Blais received a Genie Award nomination for Best Actress, and Moreau for Best Supporting Actress, at the 25th Genie Awards in 2005. The film received seven Prix Jutra nominations, including Best Picture, winning for Best Screenplay (Pelletier), Best Supporting Actress (Moreau) and Best Music (Bastien and Dumas).

References

External links
 

2004 films
2004 romantic comedy films
Canadian romantic comedy films
Films set in Montreal
Films shot in Quebec
French-language Canadian films
2000s Canadian films